Robert Lee McCaslin (April 20, 1926 March 13, 2011) was an American politician who served as a member of the Washington State Senate from 1981 to 2011, representing the 4th Legislative District.

Career 
McCaslin had served six years on the Spokane Valley Fire Commission during the 1970s. In 2009 he was elected to the Spokane Valley City Council, while serving concurrently in the State Senate.

On January 5, 2011, McCaslin resigned from the Senate due to complications following heart surgery. In February, Spokane County commissioners selected businessman Jeff Baxter to replace McCaslin.

Personal life 
In November 2014, McCaslin's son, Bob McCaslin Jr., was elected to one of the two State Representative positions in the 4th Legislative District.

McCaslin died on March 13, 2011.

References

1926 births
2011 deaths
20th-century American politicians
Republican Party Washington (state) state senators
People from Warren, Ohio